On the issue of the sexuality of Jesus, the traditional understanding of Christian churches and theologians is that Jesus did not marry and remained celibate until his death. That has not prevented speculation about alternative and fringe theories of his sexuality. The Gospels and the New Testament reveal little on the subject.

Jewish background
In first century Judaism, sexual immorality included incest, homosexuality, adultery and bestiality, according to the rabbinic interpretation of Genesis 2:24, i.e., "a man shall leave his father and his mother" forbids a man from having relations with his father's wife and his own biological mother; "cleave to his wife" forbids a man from having more than one wife, having relations with another woman, or having same-sex relations; and "they shall become one flesh" forbids a man from having relations with non-human beings (such as animals). Jesus states in the gospels that he came "not to abolish, but to fulfill" Jewish law, and at his various trials, no one could testify that Jesus broke Jewish laws (Matthew 5:17, Matthew 26:59–60).

Heterosexuality

Mary Magdalene

The non-canonical 3rd-century Gospel of Philip, using Coptic variants of the Greek , describes Jesus' relationship with Mary Magdalene.

The Gospel of Philip mentions Mary Magdalene as one of three women named Mary "who always walked with the Lord" (Philip 59.6–11). The work also says that the Lord loved her more than all the disciples, and used to kiss her often (Philip 63.34–36). Author John Dickson argues that it was common in early Christianity to kiss a fellow believer by way of greeting (1 Peter 5:14), thus such kissing would have no romantic connotations. Kripal writes that "the historical sources are simply too contradictory and simultaneously too silent" to make absolute declarations regarding Jesus' sexuality.

Bart Ehrman, a scholar of the Greek New Testament and early Christianity, concludes that historical evidence says nothing at all about Jesus' sexuality—"certainly nothing to indicate that Jesus and Mary had a sexual relationship of any kind". Ehrman says that the question people ask him most often is whether Mary Magdalene and Jesus of Nazareth married each other (after the claim was popularized in The Da Vinci Code):

Homosexuality

The disciple whom Jesus loved

The Gospel of John makes references to the "disciple whom Jesus loved" (John 13:23, John 19:26, John 21:7–20), a phrase which does not occur in the Synoptic Gospels. In the text, this "beloved disciple" is present at the crucifixion of Jesus, with Jesus' mother, Mary.

The "disciple whom Jesus loved" may be a self-reference by the author of the Gospel (John 21:24), traditionally regarded as John the Apostle.

In subsequent centuries the reference was used by those who implied a homosocial or homoerotic reading of the relationship. For example, LGBT scholar Louis Crompton says Saint Aelred of Rievaulx, in his work  ("Spiritual Friendship"), referred to the relationship of Jesus and John the Apostle as a "marriage" and held it out as an example sanctioning friendships between clerics.

James I of England may have been relying on a pre-existing tradition when he defended his relationship with the young Duke of Buckingham: "I wish to speak in my own behalf and not to have it thought to be a defect, for Jesus Christ did the same, and therefore I cannot be blamed. Christ had his son John, and I have my George." Frederick the Great wrote to similar effect in his 1748–9 poem Palladium, which includes the lines: "This good Jesus, how do you think He got John to sleep in his bed? Can't you see he was his Ganymede?"

Others who have given voice to this interpretation of the relationship between Jesus and John have been the philosophers Denis Diderot and Jeremy Bentham.

Gene Robinson, an openly gay priest, discussed the possible homoerotic inclinations of Jesus in a sermon in 2005. Robinson's claim has been criticized, including by David W. Virtue, who editorialized by calling it an "appalling deconstructionism from the liberal lobby which will spin even the remotest thing to turn it into a hint that Biblical figures are gay".

Bob Goss, theologian, LGBT activist, and the author of Jesus Acted Up, A Gay and Lesbian Manifesto and Queering Christ, Beyond Jesus Acted Up, said of the interaction between Jesus and John, it "is a pederastic relationship between an older man and a younger man. A Greek reader would understand." Theologian Ismo Dunderberg argues that the absence of accepted Greek terms for "lover" and "beloved" discounts an erotic reading.

On the other hand, Theodore W. Jennings Jr. notes that "eros does not occur either in the New Testament or in the Septuagint" and that these use  to refer to "the love of a husband for his wife or even to the illicit loves of inordinate desire", including throughout the Song of Solomon.

The naked youth
The Gospel of Mark describes how in the Garden of Gethsemane, "A young man, wearing nothing but a linen garment, was following Jesus. When they [the Temple guards] seized him, he fled naked, leaving his garment behind." (Mark 14:51–52).

The text of the naked youth is puzzling for some authors; moreover, the text only appears in Mark, which has led some commentators to allege that Mark was describing himself as the youth.

The separate and non-canonical Secret Gospel of Mark—fragments of which were contained in the controversial Mar Saba letter by Clement of Alexandria, which Morton Smith claimed to have discovered in 1958—states that Jesus during one night taught "the mystery of the kingdom of God" alone to a youth wearing only a linen cloth. This has been linked to the views of an ancient group called the Carpocratians. Some modern commentators interpret it as a baptism, others as some form of sexual initiation, and others as an allegory for a non-sexual initiation into a gnostic sect. However, the authorship of Secret Mark is still a matter of debate. Some scholars find it authentic, while others consider it to be Smith's forgery, while still others believe it to be apocryphon.

Celibacy

Eunuchs for the Kingdom of Heaven

In the Gospel of Matthew, Jesus is reported to have referred to the behavior of eunuchs to illustrate an approach to sexuality: "For there are some eunuchs, which were so born from their mother's womb: and there are some eunuchs, which were made eunuchs of men: and there be eunuchs, which have made themselves eunuchs for the kingdom of heaven's sake." (Matthew 19:3–12)

The term "eunuch" normally referred to a castrated man. Several theologians and Bible commentators have interpreted this passage as indicating Jesus's support for celibacy.

The early Christian writer Origen who was purported to have interpreted Jesus' words literally, was alleged to have castrated himself as an act of devotion. The early Church Father Tertullian wrote that Jesus himself lived as a "eunuch", likewise encouraged people to adopt this practice.

Bride of Christ

The Bride of Christ is a metaphor for the Ecclesia, likening the relationship between Christians and Jesus to a betrothal pointing to a future wedding, when Christians are re-united with Jesus. In the Gospel of John (John 3:22–36), John the Baptist speaks in terms of himself as a "best man" with the implication that Christ the bridegroom (see also Matthew 9:15) is coming to meet his bride, although there is nothing specific to identify the bride. Church Fathers such as Cyprian applied the image to the Church.

Polygamy

Latter Day Saints

Early Latter Day Saint Apostle Orson Hyde taught that Jesus was a polygamist who was married to Mary Magdalene, Martha, and Mary of Bethany, and fathered children with them. He also taught that the marriage at Cana was Jesus' own wedding. This idea is not official LDS doctrine, although it has certainly entered into Mormon folklore.

In fiction, art, and imagination
The Children of God Christian group actively promotes the view that a sexual relationship with Jesus would be desirable, encouraging devotees to imagine during sexual activity that it is Jesus who is having sex with them, and equate prophecy with Jesus' ejaculation. Historic Christian figures have also been accused of similar thoughts. Teresa of Avila's description of her most famous vision has been interpreted by secular writers, such as Dan Brown, as "a metaphor for some serious sex"; the view of Teresa having a sexual relationship with Jesus, in her visions, is exemplified by the poster art for Theresa: The Body of Christ, a 2007 film by Ray Loriga.

The Irish surrealist painter, Colin Middleton, depicted Jesus as androgynous in his Christ Androgyne (1943), currently in the Ulster Museum. Middleton added female characteristics to Christ's body, including one naked breast. The work can be interpreted as sexual, or as a general symbol of suffering humanity during World War II.

The 1976 fictional poem The Love That Dares to Speak Its Name by James Kirkup speculated what it would have been like if Jesus had had several sexual encounters with other men – including with Pontius Pilate, and a graphic description of Jesus' sexual encounter with a Roman soldier; Christian opposition to the poem's suggestions resulted in the Whitehouse v Lemon court case, a famous blasphemous libel trial.

The sadomasochistic undertones of the crucifixion have been commented upon, and occasionally portrayed explicitly in modern art; for satirical reasons, this was depicted in the controversial Jesus with erection poster, a concept which has also been depicted for serious reasons in sculpture by Terence Koh.

See also
Christianity and sexuality
Cultural and historical background of Jesus
Historical Jesus

Notes

References

Jesus
Jesus
Sexuality in the Bible
Jesus
Fringe theories